Nakhon Sawan is a city (thesaban nakhon) in Thailand, the name literally means "Heavenly City". The city is the capital of Nakhon Sawan Province, and covers the complete subdistrict (tambon) Pak Nam Pho and parts of Khwae Yai, Nakhon Sawan Tok, Nakhon Sawan Ok and Wat Sai, all of Mueang Nakhon Sawan district. As of 31 December 2020, it has a population of 82,305. Nakhon Sawan is 238 km north of Bangkok.

Geography
These converge in Nakhon Sawan to form the Chao Phraya which flows south to Bangkok and out into the Gulf of Thailand.

Bueng Boraphet, east of Nakhon Sawan, is Thailand's biggest freshwater swamp.

Population 
Since 2005, the population of Nakhon Sawan has been declining.

Climate 
Nakhon Sawan has a tropical savanna climate (Köppen climate classification Aw). Winters are dry and warm. Temperatures rise until April, which is very hot with the average daily maximum at .The monsoon season runs from May through October, with heavy rain and somewhat cooler temperatures during the day, although nights remain warm.

Transport
Nakhon Sawan lies on Route 1 (Phahonyothin Road), which runs from Bangkok through Ayutthaya and Saraburi before passing through Nakhon Sawan, then continues through Kamphaeng Phet, Lampang, and Chiang Rai until it reaches the border with Burma at Mae Sai. Route 117 leads north to Phitsanulok, and Route 225 leads east to Chaiyaphum.

Nakhon Sawan has a station on the Northern Line of the State Railway of Thailand. The station is on the east side of the river, opposite the main city, which is on the west side.

The city is served by Nakhon Sawan Airport.

Gallery

References

External links

http://nsm.go.th/index.asp (Thai)
https://web.archive.org/web/20070515174120/http://www.nakhonsawanprovince.com/ (English)

Populated places in Nakhon Sawan province
Cities and towns in Thailand
Populated places on the Chao Phraya River